Società Sportiva Città di Campobasso, commonly referred to as Campobasso FC, is an Italian football club located in Campobasso, Molise, currently playing in Eccellenza, the fifth tier of Italian football. The club is the primary team of the region of Molise and traces its roots back to 1919. Campobasso plays its home games in the Nuovo Stadio Romagnoli, which is the largest outdoor stadium in the region of Molise and one of the largest in Southern Italy with a capacity of 21,800. 

In 2022, the club was acquired by United States-based holding company North Sixth Group and an investment group backed by Kelly Ripa, Mark Consuelos, Montreal-based real estate investor Angelo Pasto and other international investors. 

Campobasso made its debut in 1919 and reached the height of its success in the 1980’s when the club was promoted to Serie B and played five consecutive seasons in the second tier of Italian football. During this period, Campobasso became a popular team across Italy and defeated larger clubs including Lazio, Parma, Genoa, and its most historic victory, a 1-0 home win against Juventus in the Coppa Italia.

Among its trophies, Campobasso has won the 2014 Coppa Italia Dilettanti, and it has won three Serie D championships in 1974-75, 1999-2000 and 2020-21. 

The primary colors of the club are red and blue and the nickname is the Wolves.

History

The Origins
The first traces of football in Campobasso date back to 1917, when rumors of the club’s formation were published in the newspaper Il Foglietto. 

In May 1919, Unione Sportiva Campobasso was founded. The club’s first president was Mercurio Magno, who was originally from Toro and was the property owner of what is today the government building of the Province of Campobasso, Palazzo Magno. With Italian football still in its early development and without a unified governing body, Campobasso played its first season against a collection of opponents, which included other local teams, military teams and teams of Austrian war prisoners who were held in Italy. Until 1929, the club played its games primarily against military opponents as well as regional teams such as Isernia, Benevento and Chieti.

Campobasso’s first season in organized Italian football took place in the 1929-30 season. Since this was prior to Italy’s formation of Molise as a region, Campobasso competed in the Campania region of the Terza Divisione. Beginning this season, the club began playing its games at a stadium in the city that was named after Giovanni Romagnoli, a local war hero who hailed from Campobasso. The first official match in Campobasso’s history as part of Italy’s new football governing body resulted in a 6-2 loss to Campanian side Fuorigrotta. The following week, Campobasso registered its first official victory against historic club Savoia. 

The first promotion in Campobasso’s history took place in the 1933-34 season, when the club moved up from the Seconda Divisione to the Prima Divisione under the guide of head coach Armand Halmos. The newly promoted Campobasso side changed its name to Littorio Campobasso beginning in the 1934-35 season. That season ended in disappointment, with the club getting relegated back to the Seconda Divisione.

The club was refounded under various names in subsequent seasons, including Fascio Giovanile Campobasso and Dopolavoro Ferraviario Campobasso (“Afterhours Train Workers of Campobasso”), and finished as high as fourth place in the 1938-39 season. During this period, the club began using red and blue jerseys, a tradition that has followed them ever since.

During the World War II years, football in Campobasso was suspended. The club hosted friendly matches and unsanctioned events to provide fans with entertainment during these years.

After World War II and the 1950’s and 60’s

Following World War II, football in Campobasso resumed beginning in 1948 under the name Unione Sportiva Campobasso. The newly formed Campobasso club was placed in the Lega Interregionale Sud along with other southern Italian clubs that represented the capitals of their respective provinces. For the 1949-50 season, Campobasso set out with ambitions to win the league, immediately pointing toward a promotion in Serie C under president Salvatore Saggese. Campobasso’s hopes for promotion disappeared following a crucial two leg tie against Tomo Maglie. 

Competing in the fourth tier in 1952, Campobasso found itself playing against ambitious clubs such as Pescara, Lecce and Bari. During this period, important players at a national level began playing for Campobasso, including Attilio De Vita and Antonio Renna. During these years, Campobasso managed solid mid-table finishes against larger regional clubs from the south and central of Italy.

In 1956, Campobasso Mayor Alessandro De Gaglia became president of the club, and signed former World Cup champion Gino Colaussi as coach. 

In 1959, Campobasso was admitted in the newly formed Serie D. De Gaglia sold the club to noted lawyer Angelo Palladino, who in turn sold the club the following year to businessman Ulderico Adolfo Colagiovanni. 

Campobasso remained in Serie D for the following seasons, and in 1963-64, assembled a roster that had aspired to win promotion to Serie C under coach Umberto De Angelis and striker Romano Sciaretta. However, once again, Campobasso came short of reaching their goal of promotion, finishing in fifth place, six points behind eventual league champion Ternana.

In the following seasons, Campobasso continued to avoid relegation and brought in well known Italian football figures such as Mario Perazzolo, who won a World Cup with the Italian National Team in 1938. Despite assembling teams that were not expected to win the league, Campobasso made a surprising run in the 1967-68 season and nearly won promotion to Serie C, falling just short after experiencing a slump during the second half of the season.

Results changed dramatically for Campobasso in the 1969-70 season, with the club being admitted to a division of Serie D alongside teams from Abruzzo, Le Marche and Puglia. Campobasso remained in the relegation zone for most of the season. During a crucial match against Turris, players on Campobasso argued furiously against refereeing that they believed to be unjust. The match was ruled a forfeit and led to Campobasso being penalized in the table and various player suspensions. The club’s fate was inevitable and the season ended in relegation. During this season, a young local player named Michele Scorrano would make his debut. Scorrano would later become one of Campobasso’s most famous footballers and a symbol of football and social justice in the region of Molise.

The 1970’s and Serie C

For the 1970-71 season, Campobasso assembled a young roster that was intended to build a foundation for future years to come. During this season, Raffaele De Risio made his debut for the club. In 1972, Campobasso regained promotion to Serie D and aspired to make a run at promotion to Serie C. 

During this period, Bruno Pinna became the captain of Campobasso. In the 1973-74 season, the club aimed at promotion to Serie C, and managed an important draw against Benevento, who was a direct competitor for promotion. The championship competition came down to the final weeks of the season, and ultimately saw Campobasso fall short of promotion by two points to Benevento. 

The following season Campobasso assembled a team that once again aspired to win promotion to Serie C, and finally was able to achieve the goal. On May 25, 1975, Campobasso beat Cerignola 5-0 in front of more than 10,000 fans, officially earning promotion to Serie C. During that season, the club also advanced deep into the Coppa Italia Semiprofessionisti, ultimately losing to Sorrento on penalties.

Competing in Serie C for the first time in its history, Campobasso set out with ambitions to comfortably avoid relegation in the 1975-76 season. The club overachieved compared to expectations, finishing impressively in sixth place.

Campobasso’s second season in Serie C was far more complicated, with various ownership conflicts and coaching changes impacting the club’s performance. Despite the challenges, Campobasso was able to avoid relegation as a result of the goal differential tiebreaker on the final matchday of the season. 

The following seasons were characterized by strong performances, which saw Campobasso reach fourth place in the 1978-79 and 1979-80 seasons.

The Golden Era of the 1980’s and Serie B

Following the momentum from previous seasons in Serie C, Campobasso’s ambitions grew and the fanbase and ownership were determined to reach Serie B for the first time in the club’s history. 

The 1980-81 season saw Campobasso fight for promotion to Serie B from start to finish. The club entered the final matchday with a chance to win the league and earn promotion for the first time in its history. However, a tie in the final game against Rende coupled with wins from top table competitors Cavese and Sambenedettese broke the hearts of Lupi fans and eliminated their promotion hopes.

In 1981-82, construction tycoon Antonio Molinari purchased the club and began to lead the team to heights it had never seen before. Despite winning only one of its first five games, Campobasso was able to turn their fortunes around with new coach Antonio Pasinato. The club quickly came together and became tactically sound with players such as Guido Biondi, Walter Ciappi and Ubaldo Biagetti. On the final matchday, May 30, 1982, Campobasso earned a historic promotion to Serie B after beating Reggina at home 1-0. 

This marked the beginning of the golden era for football in Campobasso. Under the leadership of captain and hometown hero Michele Scorrano, Campobasso embarked on an ambitious five year run that saw them compete against the best team’s in Italy. 

Campobasso’s debut in Serie B saw the club finish 13th in the table, comfortably avoiding relegation. That season, Campobasso beat legendary club Fiorentina with world champions Giancarlo Antognoni and Francesco Graziani. Campobasso also achieved impressive results against larger teams such as AC Milan and Lazio, the ladder of whom they tied at the Stadio Olimpico and beat at home 1-0.  

The 1983-84 season saw Campobasso compete for promotion to Serie A from start to finish. On the 11th matchday, Campobasso was in first place and in direct promotion zone to Italy’s top division. However, the club lost continuity during the second half of the season and finished seventh in the table. Campobasso traveled to Montreal for its training camp, and played in front of 32,000 fans, many of whom were immigrants from Molise, at Montreal’s Olympic Stadium. 

The 1984-85 season saw Campobasso experience several changes, the most notable of which was the departure of captain Michele Scorrano and head coach Antonio Pasinato. Campobasso was never able to maintain the same consistency from the previous seasons, and ultimately avoided relegation only on the final matchday of the season against Triestina. The highlight of the season was the opening of the brand new Stadio Nuovo Romagnoli, which was inaugurated with the most important win in the history of Campobasso, a 1-0 home victory in the Coppa Italia against Juventus, led by Giovanni Trappatoni. The game was attended by 40,000 fans, far surpassing the 26,000 capacity of the stadium. 

Campobasso hired former Swedish National Team assistant coach Tord Grip for the 1986-87 season. Grip was unsuccessful and after a disastrous start to the season which saw the Lupi win just two of their first 12 games, he was fired. Grip was replaced by Giampiero Vitali, who led the team to a miraculous performance during the second half of the season. However, on the final matchday of the season, with Campobasso needing a road victory at Messina to avoid relegation, the Lupi were only able to manage a 0-0 draw. Consequently, Campobasso was forced to play in a three-way relegation playout against Lazio and Taranto at Napoli’s Stadio San Paolo. 

Following a 1-1 draw against Taranto, Campobasso faced off against Lazio needing a draw to avoid relegation and remain in Serie B for the following season. A heartbreaking goal in the 53rd minute by Lazio’s Fabio Poli sealed Campobasso’s fate and relegated them back to Serie C after a successful five year run in Italy’s second highest division.

Campobasso’s first season back in Serie C was successful, with the Lupi finishing fourth but unable to achieve promotion back to Serie B. The following season saw the Lupi get relegated once again as a result of losing to Monopoli on the final matchday, and subsequently, to Catanzaro in the relegation playoffs. The following year in Serie C2, Campobasso was once again relegated following a disastrous 18th place finish, and the club subsequently went bankrupt.

The 1990’s and 2000’s

The 1990’s was a decade of ups and downs for Campobasso, which saw the club change ownership several times and bounce between the fourth and fifth tiers of Italian football. Finally, in the 1999-00 season, Campobasso achieved promotion back to Serie C2 in front of 16,000 fans at home against Pro Vasto. 

Campobasso’s first season in Serie C2 was successful, marked by the signing of goal scorer Giorgio Corona. Corona scored an important goal against direct promotion competitor Taranto in front of 18,000 fans at home, helping Campobasso qualify for the promotion playoffs. Campobasso would go on to lose the promotion playoffs to Sora, and the following season, finished 18th in the table and experienced another relegation and subsequent bankruptcy.

The early 2000’s were the darkest period in the history of Campobasso, marked by one season of absence from football entirely. The club was refounded under the name Nuovo Campobasso and restarted from the fifth tier. In 2005, Campobasso earned promotion back to Serie D.

In 2005-06, Campobasso finished ninth in the table, and the following season, qualified for the promotion playoffs following a fifth place finish. They lost in the promotion playoffs, and were sold to Campanian businessman Ferruccio Capone the following season. 

Under Capone’s ownership, Campobasso obtained a strong finish in Serie D, finishing third and qualifying for the promotion playoffs during the 2007-08 season. They were eliminated in the playoffs and failed to earn promotion to Serie C2.

The 2010’s: Return to Serie C2 and Relegation to Serie D

Following strong finishes in Serie D, Campobasso was unlucky in the playoffs and never able to win promotion back to Serie C2. Finally, in 2010, as a result of bankruptcies by other clubs, Campobasso applied for administrative admission to compete in Serie C2. On August 4, 2010, the Italian Federation accepted Campobasso’s application and admitted them to compete in Serie C2 for the 2010-11 season. 

The following three seasons saw Campobasso finish mid-table in Serie C2 before the club was deemed ineligible to play by the Italian Federation.

The remainder of the 2010’s saw Campobasso compete primarily in Serie D, where the club finished consistently safe of the relegation zone.

COVID-19 Stoppage, New Ownership and Historic Promotion

On July 2, 2019, Swiss-based Halley Holding purchased the club following a 12th place finish in Serie D. Led by new owner Mario Gesue, Campobasso was second in the table and on the verge of facing first place side Matelica before the season was stopped due to the COVID-19 pandemic. Matelica was promoted to Serie C by virtue of being in first place at the time of the stoppage.

In December 2020, New York-based North Sixth Group acquired a minority ownership stake in Campobasso, purchasing 11 percent of the club along with an option to increase its stake to 51 percent in the event of promotion to Serie C at a valuation of approximately 4 million Euros. Together, Halley Holding, led by Gesue, and North Sixth Group, led by New York-based entrepreneur Matt Rizzetta, assembled a team that was immediately favored to win Serie D. 

In their first season as co-owners, Gesue and Rizzetta proved to be a successful duo, with the club maintaining top table position for nearly the entire season. Ownership made key signings, including former Pescara veteran Vittorio Esposito and Champions League striker Ferdinando Sforzini. On June 13, 2021, Campobasso achieved promotion to Serie C, winning the league outright, and earning its first spot in the third tier of Italian football in 32 years. 

With fans of Campobasso jubilant over the club’s promotion to Serie C, the summer of 2021 was marred by ownership conflict between Gesue and Rizzetta, with the ladder intent on exercising the group’s option to purchase the majority of the club. After issuing a letter of intent to purchase the majority, Rizzetta and his group grew frustrated over Gesue’s unwillingness to disclose important documents pertinent to the closing and Gesue’s requests for a higher valuation. The story became national news in Italy, with La Repubblica citing it as an example of conflicting management styles between domestic and foreign co-ownership in Italian football. Following a process where Gesue failed to comply with closing requirements, Rizzetta and his group withdrew their letter of intent, issuing a statement on their position.

Following the summer of ownership conflict, Campobasso took the pitch for the first time in Serie C in 32 years. Beginning the year as a relegation candidate, Campobasso pulled together an impressive debut season in Serie C, finishing 13th place and comfortably avoiding relegation. The Lupi achieved impressive results, including important results against Bari, Monopoli and Andria.  

As preparations began for the 2022-23 season, Campobasso was unexpectedly ruled ineligible for readmission to Serie C by the Italian Federation on July 1, 2022 as a result of administrative non-compliance. Under Gesue, Campobasso entered a series of appeal processes that continued through the summer of 2022 and reached the heights of the Italian sporting and legal court system. With fans growing restless and frustrated, they protested against Gesue in the main square of Campobasso, pressuring the owner to cease further appeals and hand the club to new ownership in time for the 2022-23 season. Despite fans’ pleas, Gesue continued to pursue further appeals, and on August 26, 2022, Campobasso was ruled indefinitely ineligible to participate in Serie C by the Consiglio di Stato. 

On September 7, 2022, the club was ruled ineligible to participate in Serie D. Following the rejected appeals throughout summer 2022, Campobasso was at risk of losing football for the 2022-23 season.

Rebirth and New Era of American Ownership

On September 11, 2022, one week before the beginning of the season, North Sixth Group, led by Matt Rizzetta, who was a minority shareholder of the predecessor club, purchased 100 percent of the shares of Campobasso 1919, which had previously served as the secondary club of the city. The investment transformed Campobasso 1919 into the primary club of the city, replacing the previous club.
Forced to restart from the fifth tier and with less than a week until the season debut, new ownership began assembling a staff, beginning with Pino Di Meo as head coach; Pino De Filippis as sporting director; and Ivano Maselli as CEO. The staff rebuilt the roster from scratch, signing 12 new players, many of whom had Serie C and Serie D experience. The club won its first match away 0-4 against Olimpia Agnonese in front of a packed crowd of fans from Campobasso who traveled to support the new team. 
Under North Sixth Group, Campobasso 1919 secured exclusive rights to the 21,000 seat stadium Nuovo Romagnoli and opened a new retail store in downtown Campobasso. The ambitions for the Campobasso 1919 project are to build an international club that represents the immigrants from Molise across the world and to aim to bring the club to the upper tiers of Italian football within the next 5 years.
Several notable investors soon joined the Campobasso project. In November 2022, Kelly Ripa and Mark Consuelos became minority owners of the club via an investment in North Sixth Group, the majority owner and operator in Campobasso 1919. Additionally, Canadian real estate developer and Ururi native Angelo Pasto, Ohio-based lumber entrepreneur Patrick Chovan and various other American investors, joined the ownership group, which valued the club at $10 million as of November 2022. 
Upon joining the ownership group, Mark Consuelos stated: “So many people can relate to this journey regardless of whether or not they’re sports fans, whether they have Italian roots, or even if they have ever been to Italy. We all have a part of us that can relate to Campobasso deep down inside and can connect with this story of redemption.”
Under head coach Pino Di Meo, Campobasso has been dominant in its first season. After 18 matches, the club currently sits in first place in the table with 17 victories and one loss. With 84 goals scored, Campobasso currently has the most goals scored of any club in Italy’s top five leagues. After 18 matches, the club currently sits in first place in the table with 17 victories and one loss. With 84 goals scored, Campobasso currently has the most goals scored of any club in Italy’s top five leagues.

Colors and Symbols

Colors

The official team colors of Campobasso are red and blue. Home kits are red and blue striped jerseys with blue shorts and red socks. Away kits are white and blue jerseys with blue shorts and blue socks.

Symbols

The official symbol of Campobasso is the Wolf. Oftentimes, the club has integrated the symbol of castles into its shield as a testament to the City of Campobasso, which is known for the six towers that encompass the city.

Songs

The official team song is Forza Lupi Rossoblu, composed by Gino and Gina in the 1980’s.

Facilities

Stadium

Campobasso plays its home games in the 21,800 seat Stadio Nuovo Romagnoli. As of the 2022-23 season, new ownership negotiated with the City of Campobasso a long-term lease with an option to purchase the stadium, as well as the naming rights to the stadium.

Training Grounds

Campobasso trains in nearby Campodipietra in the province of Campobasso.

Retail Store

In December 2022, the official retail store of the club opened in downtown Campobasso.

Ownership and Staff

Organizational Structure

President: Matt Rizzetta (through North Sixth Group)

Vice President: Nicola Cirrincione (through North Sixth Group)

Minority Owner: Kelly Ripa and Mark Consuelos

Minority Owner: Angelo Pasto (through Stanford Properties Group)

CEO: Ivano Maselli, Esq.

Sporting Director: Pino De Filippis

Head Coach: Pino Di Meo

Secretary: Mario Colalillo

Press Office: Andrea Vertolo

Communications: Giacomo Reale

Marketing: Francesco Pietrunti

Social Media: Emmanuel Minardi

Stadium Manager: Francesco Furno

Sponsors and Media

Official Sponsors

Main sponsors include La Molisana, Caffe Camardo, Stanford Properties Group, Milojo, Autopia and North Sixth Group.

Media

Campobasso is covered regionally by various television networks, including TeleMolise, TeleRegione and TRSP. All games are live streamed for fans across the world on CB TV, the official YouTube channel of Campobasso. 

The Campobasso story has received notable international media attention, including in Forbes, ESPN.com, People Magazine and Bloomberg.

Culture

Campobasso in Mass Media

Campobasso has been mentioned in various Italian films and built a cult following as a favorite underdog tale. The club was cited in the popular Italian film Il Tifoso, L’Arbitro e il Calciatore (The Fan, The Referee and the Player), and was a childhood favorite of Italian National Team goalkeeper Gianluigi Buffon.

Campobasso International Clubs

There are several Campobasso fan clubs across the world, including in Montreal, Cleveland, Amsterdam, Buenos Aires and New York.

Fans

Fanbase

Campobasso has a strong following throughout Molise as the region’s primary club. There are various organized fan groups that support Campobasso, most notably Commando Rossoblu, Pazzi del Campobasso, Campobasso Storia di un Grande Amore, NFO, Esiliati, The Four New Streets and Vecchio Cuc 1981.

Rivalries and Friendships

The fanbase of Campobasso is twinned with fanbases from other clubs across Italy and Europe, most notably Palermo, Fasano and Celta Vigo.

The main rivalries include Pescara, Frosinone and the Molise Derby against Isernia.

Honours 
 Coppa Italia Dilettanti:
Champion : 1996–97
Champion : 2004–05
Champion : 2013–14
Champion : 2022–23

References

External links
 Official homepage

Football clubs in Molise
Campobasso
Association football clubs established in 1919
Serie B clubs
Serie C clubs
Serie D clubs
1919 establishments in Italy
1948 establishments in Italy
1990 establishments in Italy
1996 establishments in Italy
2003 establishments in Italy
Phoenix clubs (association football)
2013 establishments in Italy